The 2019 Mercer Bears football team represented Mercer University as a member the Southern Conference (SoCon) during the 2019 NCAA Division I FCS football season. They were led by seventh-year head coach Bobby Lamb and played their home games at the Five Star Stadium in Macon, Georgia. Mercer finished the season 4–8 overall and 3–5 in SoCon play to place seventh.

Previous season
The Bears finished the 2018 Mercer Bears football team 5–6 overalla and 4–4 in SoCon play to place in a three-way tie for fifth.

Preseason

Preseason media poll
The SoCon released their preseason media poll and coaches poll on July 22, 2019. The Bears were picked to finish in fourth place by the media and in fifth place by the coaches.

Preseason All-SoCon Teams
The Bears placed seven different players on the preseason all-SoCon teams.

Offense

1st team

Tyray Devezin – RB

Austin Sanders – OL

2nd team

Chris Ellington – TE

David Durden – WR

Defense

2nd team

Dorian Kithcart – DL

Will Coneway – LB

Malique Fleming – DB

Specialists

1st team

David Durden – RS

Schedule

Game summaries

at Western Carolina

at Presbyterian

Austin Peay

at Furman

Campbell

Chattanooga

VMI

at The Citadel

Samford

Wofford

at East Tennessee State

at North Carolina

Ranking movements

References

Mercer
Mercer Bears football seasons
Mercer Bears football